William Joseph Butters (born January 10, 1951) is an American former professional ice hockey player. He played in the World Hockey Association from 1975 to 1978 and then in the National Hockey League from 1978 to 1979. After his playing career Butters became a coach, serving as an assistant coach for several years with the University of Minnesota and then coaching at the NCAA Division III and high school levels.

Life and career
Butters was born in Saint Paul, Minnesota, and played high school hockey at White Bear Lake, Minnesota. He played for the University of Minnesota from 1971–73, coached by Glen Sonmor and Herb Brooks, and he served as team captain in 1972-73. Butters went on to play 217 games in the World Hockey Association for the Minnesota Fighting Saints, Houston Aeros, Edmonton Oilers and New England Whalers, followed by 72 games in the National Hockey League with the Minnesota North Stars.

In 1980, after retiring as a player, Butters became involved the Christian Hockey Camps International, run by Hockey Ministries International.

From 2010 to 2012, Butters was an assistant coach with the University of Wisconsin Badgers. Butters stepped down from this position in order to return to work with the Ministries.

Career statistics

Regular season and playoffs

References

External links
 

1951 births
Living people
American men's ice hockey defensemen
Edmonton Oilers (WHA) players
Houston Aeros (WHA) players
Ice hockey people from Saint Paul, Minnesota
Minnesota Fighting Saints players
Minnesota Golden Gophers men's ice hockey players
Minnesota North Stars players
New England Whalers players
Oklahoma City Blazers (1965–1977) players
Oklahoma City Stars players
Undrafted National Hockey League players